Chaker or alternative Shaker may refer to:

People

Given name
 Chaker Alhadhur (born 1999), Comorian footballer
 Chaker Bargaoui (born 1983), Tunisian footballer
 Chaker Ghezal (born 1977), Tunisian volleyball player
 Chaker Meftah (born 1957), Tunisian football manager
 Chaker Rguiî (born 1987), Tunisian footballer 
 Chaker Zouaghi (born 1985), Tunisian footballer

Surname
Fadel Chaker, or Fadl Shaker, (born 1969), Lebanese singer
Ludovic Chaker (born 1979), French diplomat and politician
Salem Chaker (born 1950), Algerian linguist
Slim Chaker (1961–2017), Tunisian politician and minister

Places
 Menzel Chaker, town in Tunisia
 Chaker, Iran (disambiguation)

See also
 Chakar (disambiguation)
 Shaker (disambiguation)